Qi Xueting (Western name: Snow Qi; born 7 November 1986) is a Chinese ice hockey player and coach. She was a member of the Chinese women's national ice hockey team during 2003 to 2015 and served as the team's assistant coach for the IIHF Women's World Championship Division 1B tournaments in 2018 and 2019 . Qi represented China in the women's ice hockey tournament at the 2010 Winter Olympics and medaled at the Asian Winter Games in 2007 and 2011, and at the 2009 Winter Universiade.

Qi most recently played with the KRS Vanke Rays of the Zhenskaya Hockey League (ZhHL) during the 2020–21 ZhHL season.

References

External links 
 
 
 
 

1986 births
Living people
Chinese women's ice hockey defencemen
Sportspeople from Harbin
Shenzhen KRS Vanke Rays players
Strathmore Rockies players
Ice hockey players at the 2010 Winter Olympics
Olympic ice hockey players of China
Asian Games medalists in ice hockey
Ice hockey players at the 2007 Asian Winter Games
Ice hockey players at the 2011 Asian Winter Games
Medalists at the 2007 Asian Winter Games
Medalists at the 2011 Asian Winter Games
Asian Games bronze medalists for China
Competitors at the 2009 Winter Universiade
Universiade medalists in ice hockey
Universiade silver medalists for China